Vincenzo Milani (1597–1666) was a Roman Catholic prelate who served as Bishop of Hvar (1644–1666) and Bishop of Caorle (1641–1644).

Biography
Vincenzo Milani was born in Trevise, Italy in 1597. On 1 July 1641, he was appointed during the papacy of Pope Urban VIII as Bishop of Caorle. On 7 July 1641, he was consecrated bishop by Giulio Cesare Sacchetti, Cardinal-Priest of Santa Susanna, with Emilio Bonaventura Altieri, Bishop of Camerino, and Bernardo Florio, Bishop of Canea, serving as co-consecrators. On 19 December 1644, he was appointed during the papacy of Pope Innocent X as Bishop of Hvar. He served as Bishop of Hvar until his death in 1666.

References

External links and additional sources
 (for Chronology of Bishops)
 (for Chronology of Bishops)

17th-century Roman Catholic bishops in Croatia
Bishops appointed by Pope Urban VIII
Bishops appointed by Pope Innocent X
1597 births
1666 deaths
17th-century Roman Catholic bishops in the Republic of Venice